Liquid Comics is an Indian comic book publishing company, founded in 2006 as Virgin Comics LLC, which produced stories (many of which are Indian-culture related) for an international audience. The company was founded by Sir Richard Branson and his Virgin Group, author Deepak Chopra, filmmaker Shekhar Kapur, and entrepreneurs Sharad Devarajan, Suresh Seetharaman, and Gotham Chopra. In August 2008, the company restructured and relocated from New York to Los Angeles. On September 24, 2008, it was announced that Virgin Comics was renamed Liquid Comics after a management buyout.

Company

Formation

Virgin Comics LLC and Virgin Animation Private Limited are collaborative companies formed by Virgin Group entrepreneur Sir Richard Branson, author Deepak Chopra, filmmaker Shekhar Kapur and Gotham Entertainment Group (South Asia's largest comics publisher) in 2006. The companies spun out of the previously announced partnership between Chopra, Kapur, and Gotham Entertainment (but not Branson). Gotham Studios Asia was announced in late 2004, planning its first release in 2005, which failed to occur. Variety reported in January 2006 that Gotham Entertainment head Sharad Devarajan and Chopra's son Gotham were the key movers, and approached Branson as a potential partner. With Branson on board, Gotham Studios Asia became Virgin Comics and Animation, with Devarajan taking the role of CEO, with Gotham Chopra as chief creative officer, with Indian advertising executive Suresh Seetharaman running Virgin Animation from India. The companies are based in Bangalore with the comics arm having its headquarters in New York. Variety reported that Devarajan and Chopra planned to spend 2006 "staffing the Indian operation with approximately 150 people, most of them artists".

Devarajan, who continues to operate Gotham Entertainment as a separate entity, stated the aim of the Virgin imprint was to:
"create content that not only reaches a global audience but also helps start a creative renaissance in India."

Focusing on Asia "as an area to inspire and create content and drive revenue... to reach a global audience", the two arms allow for properties to be translated into "full media properties across a wide line of products and media outlets".

The companies' Press Release qualified this focus, writing:
"The Company believes that in the next decade, Asia will become one of the largest producers, as well as the largest consumers, of entertainment products. Virgin Comics intends to look to Asia, and India in particular, as both a growing market for consumers of entertainment products and also a source for unique, innovative content to be brought to the world in comics and licensing into movies, animation, toys, video games and consumer products...

This partnership brings Virgin, one of the world's leading youth lifestyle brands, into the areas of comics and animation for the first time. Virgin Founder, Sir Richard Branson commented on the new partnership by saying, "India is an incredibly vibrant market which Virgin already, through Virgin Atlantic, has the pleasure of working in. Virgin Comics embodies all that Virgin stands for - innovation and launching, developing and opening up markets, for the benefit of the consumer - both at home and abroad... I am delighted that Virgin Comics, will not only help to launch the Indian comic market and spin it into the west, but will develop new and exciting talent - giving a whole generation of young, creative thinkers a voice."

Adrian Sington, Executive Chairman of Virgin Books noted that "the market for comics and graphic novels worldwide is exploding... [partly due to] the emergence of comics out of Asia." Sharad Devarajan referred to the Japanese forms of Anime and Manga, stressing their impact on world media, and outlining Virgin Comics' "mission... to spark a creative renaissance in India, reinventing Indian character entertainment and permeating this new style and vision throughout the globe... launching a new wave of characters that simultaneously appeal to audiences from Boston to Beijing to Bangalore."

Virgin Comics' "Vision"
Virgin Comics claims a twofold vision:

 The creation of original stories and character properties that tap into the vast library of mythology and re-invent the rich indigenous narratives of Asia in a unique, compelling, and entertaining way.
 Collaborating with creative talent from around the world – from filmmakers, to writers, to musicians, and other artists – to craft original stories and character properties initially in the form of comics and graphic novels subsequently to be developed into films, television, animation, gaming, wireless content, online, merchandise and more.

Envisioned as a creative exchange, Virgin Comics and Virgin Animation leads the transition of India as an outsource to a source of innovative and dynamic creations and creators. With an eye on the rapidly evolving entertainment market (550 million youngsters under age of 20 years in the next 10 years in India alone), Virgin Comics seeks  to create properties infused with a mythic sensibility that resonate with readers and audiences around the world.

Restructuring
On August 26, 2008, it was reported that Virgin Comics had shut down its New York office. A statement released by CEO Sharad Devarajan confirmed closure of the New York office, but indicated that the company would be restructuring and relocating to Los Angeles. Devarajan said that further information would be released later. Gotham Entertainment will be unaffected by this change. According to sources, Virgin will continue to own the rights for the properties which it published.

Liquid Comics
On September 24, 2008, it was announced that Virgin Comics changed its name to Liquid Comics. Among the first projects of Liquid Comics is a Hollywood movie based on the comic Ramayan 3392 A.D., together with Mandalay Pictures and Mark Canton, one of the producers of the movie 300. The movie is set for a 2011 release. Liquid Comics also entered into an agreement with FremantleMedia Enterprises to create television shows. The first two shows in development under the partnership are First Family and Ani-Max.

Gotham Chopra was working with Michael Jackson on a graphic novel called Fated which was announced for a June 2010 release through Villard and is copyrighted to Liquid Comics.

Graphic India 
On February 20, 2013, Liquid Comics began to refocus on Devarajan's company Graphic India.

Comic lines
Virgin Comics' initial lines were their flagship Shakti line, the Maverick (later Voices) line and the Director's Cut imprint.  Although the first title, scheduled to debut mid-2006, was meant to be the first "Director's Cut" title, by John Woo, it in fact was the second "Director's Cut" comic, and Virgin's fifth overall when it debuted in October.

Shakti
The Shakti line ("Shakti" means "power" in Sanskrit) feature Indian mythology, art, history, classical stories, and other related themes, often with a modern twist. Its debut titles - two of the first three to see print from Virgin Comics - were Devi and The Sadhu. Devi was written by Siddharth Kotain, and featured "a modern take on a very ancient myth", in which title character Devi becomes a "warrior of the light" after the pantheon of gods rebirth her in response to "the rapid decay of the city of Sitapur" caused by "fearsome renegade god Bala."

The Sadhu, written by Gotham Chopra himself, is a story of revenge, from an individual who "was once a Sadhu – what, in the East, they call mystics."

Shakti titles

Director's Cut
The Director's Cut line is designed to showcase the work of film directors, and effectively give them an unlimited budget to create works that might be more difficult to realise on screen. It sees directors such as Shekhar Kapur, Guy Ritchie and John Woo creating comics, and is rumoured to include the legendary Terry Gilliam at some point in the future. Gilliam's reputed interest (and that of the other directors) is said to be in part due to the comics' ability to "provoke new Hollywood interest in old ideas and, if nothing else, give the audience a glimpse of what [was] intended" in a potential film version. Guy Ritchie's Gamekeeper has been picked up by Warner Brothers Studios to be made into a motion picture, set to start filming sometime in 2009. 

Virgin Comics' initial comments stated that the aim was "to launch comic titles in collaboration with iconic film-makers",  with "Woo’s Seven Brothers [originally listed as] the debut comic of the Director’s Cut line".
In fact, the first "Director's Cut" comic, and Virgin Comics' second overall was Snake Woman, from Shekhar Kapur and artist Zeb Wells. It revolves around 25-year-old Jessica Peterson, a Los Angeles-based woman with the tagline: "STUDENT…WAITRESS…MASS-MURDERER."

Virgin's highest-profile comic in the west, and the one announced before any other, became the company's fifth release in October, 2006. John Woo's Seven Brothers was a Chinese folklore idea was expanded by Preacher, Hitman and Punisher author Garth Ennis into "a modern, global story," in a manner that is "clearly a brother to the film medium," said Woo. John Woo described his experience "working in comics [as] quite comfortable", since "it's like the ultimate storyboard". Ennis described the manner in which he became involved as remarkably straightforward. Indeed, in his own words: "All they had to say was ‘John Woo’ and I was sold instantly." The covers were by Yoshitaka Amano, with Greg Horn producing a variant for #1.

Director's Cut titles

Voices
The Voices line (formerly known as the Maverick line) is intended to feature new talent, as well as presenting comics by actors and musicians. The line's first release was in December, 2006, and written by Eurythmics frontman Dave Stewart. Dave Stewart's Walk In #1 was loosely based on "Stewart’s real-life experiences as a young man doing stage shows as "Memory Man" and – during this time of his life – suffering from odd moments of memory loss himself". It was scripted and expanded by Jeff Parker, author of the acclaimed comic Interman.

Voices titles

Other
Virgin comics produced a Dan Dare mini-series, written by Garth Ennis.

Additionally, "the company will tap into innovative creators in comics, film and entertainment from around the world." Virgin Comics animators have worked on graphic novels, and the venture is linked to Virgin Animation.  One such graphic novel is the upcoming children's environmental book The Econauts.

At the NYCC it was revealed Grant Morrison would working with Virgin Comics to produce "webisodes" (short animated stories) based on the Mahābhārata, he said it wouldn't be a direct translation but "Like the Beatles took Indian music and tried to make psychedelic sounds…I'm trying to convert Indian storytelling to a western style for people raised on movies, comics, and video games." It was also announced that Stan Lee will create a new superhero team to appear in a new Virgin title, the details of which were being kept secret for the moment.

Virgin also started Coalition Comix on MySpace, where users could suggest ideas for a comic which would then get made. The first one was Queen's Rook, written by Mike Carey.

Novel art
Kama Sutra
The Life of Buddha

Comics creators
Virgin Comics' creators include:

Jenna Jameson
John Woo
Nicolas Cage
Garth Ennis
Alex Ross
Guy Ritchie
Shekhar Kapur
Deepak Chopra
Gotham Chopra
Samit Basu
Dave Stewart
Andy Diggle
Mike Carey
Saurav Mohapatra
Shamik Dasgupta
Terry Gilliam
Edward Burns
Duran Duran
Bart Sears
Ron Marz
Grant Morrison

Television
Virgin Comics will be co-producing a number of TV series with the Sci-Fi Channel and the first will be The Stranded, written by Mike Carey.

See also
Gotham Entertainment Group
Indian comics

References

External links

 
Publishing companies established in 2006
Comic book publishing companies of the United States
Companies formed by management buyout